is a museum in Yokohama, Kanagawa Prefecture, Japan.

External links
 Official site 
 Trip report and photos of the museum
Article about the museum

Museums in Yokohama
Toy museums